Beverley Jane McEwan (née Moxon; previously Atkinson, Sowden and Callard; born 28 March 1957) is an English actress, known for her role as Liz McDonald in the long-running ITV soap opera Coronation Street and Flo Henshaw in Two Pints of Lager and a Packet of Crisps.

Career
At the age of seven, Callard made her acting debut as Darius the page boy. After leaving school in 1973, she took a job as a shorthand typist. She later turned to acting and appeared on stage as Jackie Coryton in Noël Coward's Hay Fever, Liz and Rita in Billy Liar and The Wicked Queen in Snow White. Callard made her television debut (as Beverley Sowden) in the Yorkshire Television soap Emmerdale Farm as Angie Richards in 1983. Other roles followed, including parts in Hinge & Bracket: Dear Ladies, Hells Bells, Will You Love Me Tomorrow and The Practice.

She has released books and exercise videos called Real Results, Rapid Results, Ultimate Results and Lasting Results. She also appeared on GMTV and This Morning and has had a fitness page in the Daily Mirror.

In 2000, she played the part of Barbara in the BBC sitcom The Peter Principle. In 2001, Callard was cast as Flo Henshaw in the BBC Three sitcom Two Pints of Lager and a Packet of Crisps and continued in the role for two years. During this time, she also guested on Sky1's Mile High. Between June and December 2010, Callard was a recurring panellist on ITV's talk show Loose Women.

She was due to appear as the Wicked Queen in the Christmas pantomime Sleeping Beauty at the Lyceum Theatre, Sheffield, from December 2011, but had to withdraw from the production for undisclosed health reasons. She was subsequently replaced by her former Coronation Street co-star Margi Clarke. She made her return to the stage in 2012 playing Mari Hoff in a British touring production of The Rise and Fall of Little Voice. In 2019, she performed in a touring production of The Rocky Horror Picture Show at the Liverpool Empire.

In November 2020, it was announced that Callard would take part in the twentieth series of I'm a Celebrity...Get Me Out of Here. Callard became the third celebrity to be voted off alongside Victoria Derbyshire on 30 November.

Since March 2022, Callard has appeared in Gold comedy Newark, Newark as Pauline.

Coronation Street

In 1984, Callard played Gail (Helen Worth) and Brian Tilsley's (Christopher Quinten) friend June Dewhurst in Coronation Street. In 1989, she returned to the series in the more significant role of Liz McDonald. Callard's first appearance as Liz aired on 27 October 1989. Callard's character of Liz McDonald has since been abused, a kidnap victim, a harassed mother and an unfaithful wife. Callard left Coronation Street in November 1998 to concentrate on her other career as an aerobics instructor and to spend more time with her family. In 2003, she returned to Coronation Street. In March 2011, Callard returned to Coronation Street having left for a short break in November 2010. Her last scenes before another exit were shown in April 2011 as she left Coronation Street, seemingly for good. On 30 May 2013, it was announced that she would return, again in the role of Liz McDonald; she returned on screen on 14 October 2013. In March 2016, Callard announced a two-month break from the series, as a result of her ongoing battle with clinical depression. She returned to filming in May 2016. In November 2019, Callard announced her departure from Coronation Street. Her final scenes aired in 2020.

Personal life
Aged 16, Callard, then pregnant, married Paul Atkinson in 1974. She later miscarried. Two years later, the couple had their first child, a daughter named Rebecca Callard, who later became an actress. A year later, the couple divorced, with Callard later recalling: "we were too young. He had an alcohol-induced violent side."

In 1980, Callard married David Sowden, an economics teacher. During the marriage, Callard had an abortion. In 1988, the couple separated amicably. Callard became pregnant in 1989 to Steve Callard, and the couple married. Their son, Joshua was born in 1990. The pair separated due to Steve's infidelity, once occurring whilst Callard was recovering from cervical cancer treatment.

In 2008, it was announced that Callard's pay, along with other Coronation Street cast members, would be cut due to the credit crunch. She lost 40% of her earnings.

In 2016, Callard spoke about her nervous breakdown in 2009 and her depression.

Callard lived with her fourth husband, Jon McEwan, in Eccles, Salford, Greater Manchester. They married on 30 October 2010, at the Hazelwood Castle Hotel, near Leeds. In 2022 they moved to Norfolk.

She is a vegan.

Awards and nominations

See also
List of vegans

References

External links
 

1957 births
Living people
English television actresses
English soap opera actresses
English stage actresses
English exercise instructors
People with mood disorders
I'm a Celebrity...Get Me Out of Here! (British TV series) participants
Actresses from Yorkshire
People from Morley, West Yorkshire
20th-century English actresses
21st-century English actresses